Samuel Williams (born 18 March 1994 in Worcester) is an English racing cyclist, riding for Saint Piran.

References

External links

1994 births
Living people
English male cyclists
Sportspeople from Worcester, England